Club de Fútbol Halcones de Querétaro was a Mexican football team that played in Primera División A and Segunda División de México and currently plays in Liga de Balompié Mexicano. They plays their home games in the city of Cadereyta de Montes, México.

History 
The club was founded in 1997 as a subsidiary team of Club América, whose objective was to train youth players for that squad and give space to players who had no place in the main team. The team competed in Primera División 'A' until 2001, to later be disbanded.

In 2021, the Limsoccer F.C. board began procedures to join the Liga de Balompié Mexicano after having problems participating in the Liga TDP and USPL MX leagues. In July 2021 the team was accepted as a new member of the LBM, in August the club was renamed Halcones de Quéretaro and was moved to Cadereyta de Montes.

Players

First-team squad

References

External links

Football clubs in Querétaro
Ascenso MX teams